McGrogan is a surname of Irish origin. Notable people with the surname include:

Felix McGrogan (1914 - 1989), Scottish football player
Hugh McGrogan (1957 - 1988), Scottish football player
Joe McGrogan (born 1955), Scottish football player

Surnames of Irish origin